George Brown Salvidge (December 1919 – 23 November 1941) was an English professional footballer who played as a winger in the Football League for Hull City.

Personal life
Salvidge served as a lance corporal in the York and Lancaster Regiment during the Second World War. He was killed at Tobruk on 23 November 1941 and was buried at the Knightsbridge War Cemetery, Acroma.

Career statistics

References

1919 births
Date of birth missing
1941 deaths
People from Bridlington
Footballers from the East Riding of Yorkshire
English footballers
Association football wingers
English Football League players
Hull City A.F.C. players
Burton Town F.C. players
York and Lancaster Regiment soldiers
British Army personnel killed in World War II
Date of birth unknown
Burials at Knightsbridge War Cemetery
Military personnel from Yorkshire